David Cunningham may refer to:
David Cunningham (bishop) (c. 1540–1600), Bishop of Aberdeen
David Cunningham Snr (born 1943), Scottish accordionist, teacher, composer and band leader
David Cunningham (American football), American football coach
David Cunningham (ice hockey) (1928–2020), Australian ice hockey player
David Cunningham (musician) (born 1954), Irish musician and artist
David Cunningham (politician) (born 1936), Australian politician
David Cunningham (sociologist), American sociologist, scholar, and professor
David Cunningham (sport shooter) (born 1962), Australian sport shooter
David Douglas Cunningham (1843–1914), Scottish doctor
David Frederick Cunningham (1900–1979), American Prelate of the Roman Catholic Church
David L. Cunningham (born 1971), American film director and producer
David S. Cunningham Jr. (1935–2017), American politician and Los Angeles City Council member
David S. Cunningham III, lawyer and public servant in Los Angeles
Sir David Cunningham of Robertland, Scottish courtier and architect
Sir David Cunningham of Auchenharvie (d. 1659), Scottish courtier and architect

See also
David Cuningham (born 1997), Australian rules footballer for Carlton